Jamali Balochan (جمالی بلوچاں) is a village, which is located in Tehsil Noorpur Thal, District Khushab, Punjab, Pakistan. The village Jamali Balochan is situated, 70 kilometres away from its District Headquarters Khushab, on Kaka-Noor Pur Thal Road, which is connected with Joharabad-Muzaffar Garh Highway. Administratively, the village is being regulated by a Union Council, administered by The District Local Government Department.

The history of Jamali Balochan is that, in the 1600s/a less or more than four hundred years ago, the ancestors of Jamali Balochan, who were originally hailed from DG Khan (knowingly when it was part of Balochistan), they travelled alongside the eastern bank of the Indus River (Daray-e-Sindh), through the areas of Layyah, Bhakkar, Darya Khan and lastly settled in suburbs of Noor Pur Thal, at that time on western side of Jehlum River. The Baloch community of Jamali Balochan village consists upon different tribes, like, Shahikhel, Lashari, Ali Khel, Sargani, Hakum Khel, Saheb Khel and Bilawals. The Baloch community, residing here has a rich traditional social norms of life, particularly in reference to their wedding ceremonies, even at the eve of obituary. Being a migrated community from old Balochistan, has no blood relations in neighbouring villages. Furthermore, the aforesaid Baloch Tribes of village Jamali avoid Intra-Tribe marriages and females observes strict Parda. 
The area of Thal, in District Khushab, particularly village Jamali Balochan is famous being peaceful, crime-free and always has a warm heartedly welcome to guest visitors.
On religious side, Baloch community of Jamali Balochan is a highly liberal Muslim class, and intra-sect relations are admirable. Baloch villagers have never draw a line between sects, and are living with harmony and sharing pain of each other, without any sectarian identification.

The whole area of Thal including village Jamali Balochan observes extrem hot summar season from May to August, the village comprises upon thousands acres of agricultural barani land and famous for agricultural product gram, (chickpea), through an old traditional way of cultivation. 
Unfortunately, the village is facing an acute deficiency of basic civic facilities of sanitation, Primary Healthcare, a good standard of School Education, and Public Transport. Resultantly a trend of migration towards urban areas of country, is rapidly increasing, hence the village needs a special attention of Government.

References 

Populated places in Khushab District